Thomas Ulbricht (born 10 July 1985) is a Paralympian athlete from Germany competing mainly in category P12 pentathlon and T12 sprint events.

Career
He competed within the 2004 Summer Paralympics in Athens, Greece.  There he finished fifth in the men's 400 metres - T12 event and went out in the first round of the men's 4 x 100 metre relay - T11-13 event.  He also competed at the 2008 Summer Paralympics in Beijing, China.  , a silver medal in the men's Pentathlon - P12 event, went out in the first round of the men's 4 x 100 metre relay - T11-13 event, finished seventh in the men's Javelin throw - F11/12 event and finished tenth in the men's Long jump - F12 event

External links
 

1985 births
Living people
German male sprinters
German pentathletes
Paralympic athletes of Germany
Athletes (track and field) at the 2004 Summer Paralympics
Athletes (track and field) at the 2008 Summer Paralympics
Paralympic silver medalists for Germany
Medalists at the 2008 Summer Paralympics
Paralympic medalists in athletics (track and field)